The Canwest Canspell National Spelling Bee, later called the Postmedia Canspell National Spelling Bee, was a spelling bee held annually in Canada from 2005–2012. The bee was affiliated with the United States-based Scripps National Spelling Bee and used similar rules and word lists, adapted to suit Canadian usage and spelling. It was organized by Canwest Global Communications, parent company of 9 of the regional sponsors, from 2005–2010 and by the Postmedia Network from 2010–2012 after Canwest's bankruptcy.  The spelling bee ended in 2012.

Competition

As of 2011, regional finals are held in 21 Canadian cities from Victoria to St. John's.

The winner in each of the regional finals participated in the national final in Ottawa each April from 2005 to 2010. From 2005 to 2009, the regional winners also qualified for the Scripps National Spelling Bee in Washington D.C. whether they won the nationals or not. In 2010, because of the economic downturn and Canwest's bankruptcy, only the winner of the nationals participated in the SNSB. From 2011 onwards, the top 3 spellers, including the national champion, will compete in the SNSB.

The name of the competition was changed subtly in 2009 from "CanWest CanSpell" to "Canwest Canspell", in line with Canwest's elimination of CamelCase spelling from its corporate brand.

In late 2010, the competition was renamed the Postmedia Canspell Spelling Bee as a result of Canwest's bankruptcy in October 2009, where Canwest's assets were sold to Shaw Communications and the Postmedia Network.

Media and the Bee

When Canwest sponsored the bee, it enjoyed significant coverage from Canwest-owned media outlets. A documentary on the event was produced in 2005, a live broadcast was aired in 2007, and edited versions of the finals were broadcast in 2006 and 2008. These broadcasts were all aired on the Global Television Network. Live webcasts are also featured each year. In 2011, CBC became the new broadcast partner and created a special one-hour primetime feature on the Canadian final called "Spelling Night in Canada". It usually takes place in the last week of March.

All Postmedia daily newspapers participate in the spelling bee, with the exception of The Province in Vancouver, as the company also owns the sponsoring Vancouver Sun. Postmedia's National Post, based in the Toronto area, serves as sponsor for that market. Uniquely, the Hamilton competition was co-sponsored by the National Post and a Canwest-owned TV station, CHCH-TV, and not a local paper such as The Hamilton Spectator.  Hamilton does not have a local sponsor beyond 2009, after which CHCH was sold from Canwest to Channel Zero Inc.  Hamilton spellers compete at the Toronto National Post spelling bee.

Other newspaper sponsors include the Winnipeg Free Press, The Telegram in St. John's, The Chronicle Herald in Halifax, The Chronicle-Journal in Thunder Bay, and The Guardian in Charlottetown and The Daily News in Kamloops, British Columbia.

The Saturn brand of General Motors was the presenting sponsor for 2005 and 2006. Saturn withdrew in 2007 and was replaced by Canada Post. Other national sponsors have included Air Canada, AIC Limited, Oxford University Press, the Canadian Museum of Civilization, the Lord Elgin Hotel, the Egg Farmers of Canada, and the Canadian Broadcasting Corporation (CBC).

Competition statistics

National champions

Runners-up

Winning words and word runner-up misspelled

Staff
Jacques Bailly, the long-time pronouncer for the American Scripps National Spelling Bee, also was the pronouncer for the Canadian Canspell Bee.

References

External links
Official Canspell website

English language
Spelling competitions
Educational organizations based in Canada
Recurring events established in 2005
Competitions in Canada
2005 establishments in Canada